The appendicular artery, also known as the appendiceal artery, commonly arises from the terminal branch of the ileocolic artery, or less commonly from the posterior cecal artery or an ileal artery. It descends behind the termination of the ileum and enters the mesoappendix of the vermiform appendix.  It runs near the free margin of the mesoappendix and ends in branches which supply the appendix.

External links
  - "Branches of Superior Mesenteric Artery"

References

Arteries of the abdomen